Nelson Amadin (born 31 October 2001) is a Dutch professional footballer who plays as a forward for German club Schalke 04 II.

Career

Dordrecht
Born in Rotterdam, Amadin started his career in the youth of Spartaan '20, before moving to the Feyenoord academy. In 2019, he moved to FC Dordrecht as a free agent and signing a two-year contract. He made his senior debut on 15 November 2019 in a 1–1 home draw against Roda JC Kerkrade, coming on as a substitute in the 66th minute for Thomas Schalekamp. His contract was not renewed, making him a free agent on 1 July 2021.

Schalke 04
On 7 January 2022, Amadin announced via Instagram that he had joined Schalke 04. Shortly after, the club confirmed the signing and stated that he had been added to the reserve team competing in Regionalliga West. He made his debut for the club on 22 January in a 4–1 away victory against Borussia Mönchengladbach II, immediately contributing with two goals to secure the win.

Personal life
Amadin is the nephew of Bayern Munich player Joshua Zirkzee. They both played youth football with Spartaan '20.

References

External links
 
 

2001 births
Living people
Dutch footballers
Association football forwards
Footballers from Rotterdam
FC Dordrecht players
FC Schalke 04 II players
Eerste Divisie players
Regionalliga players
Dutch expatriate footballers
Expatriate footballers in Germany
Dutch expatriate sportspeople in Germany